Maidaan is an upcoming Indian Hindi-language biographical sports drama film directed by Amit Sharma and produced by Boney Kapoor, Akash Chawla, Arunava Joy Sengupta and Zee Studios. Based on the golden era of Indian football (1952–1962), it stars Ajay Devgn as football coach Syed Abdul Rahim along with Priyamani, Rudranil Ghosh and Gajraj Rao. The music is composed by A. R. Rahman. The film is scheduled for theatrical release on 23 June 2023.

Cast 
 Ajay Devgan as Syed Abdul Rahim
Priyamani as Syed Abdul Rahim's wife
Nitanshi Goel as Syed Abdul Rahim's Daughter
Aryann Bhowmik
Gajraj Rao
Rudranil Ghosh
Rohit Mondal
Rishabh Joshi
Diego Torres Kuri
Akshay Kumar (cameo)

Production 
Principal photography commenced on 19 August 2019 and experienced long delays due to COVID-19 pandemic, ultimately ending in May 2022. The film was scheduled to release in theatre on 3 June 2022 but was delayed due to impending post-production works. Now it is scheduled to release in theatre on 23 June 2023.

Release

Theatrical
After multiple delays, the film is scheduled for a theatrical release on 23 June 2023.

References

External links 

Maidaan on Bollywood Hungama

2020s Hindi-language films
Indian biographical drama films
Upcoming Hindi-language films
Indian association football films
Films directed by Amit Sharma (director)
Films scored by A. R. Rahman
Film productions suspended due to the COVID-19 pandemic
Indian sports films
Football in India